The 1911 United States Senate election in New Jersey was held on January 24–25, 1911. Republican incumbent John Kean did not run for re-election to a third term. The open seat was won by Democrat James Edgar Martine with Republican former Governor Edward C. Stokes as the runner-up.

Prior to passage of the Seventeenth Amendment to the United States Constitution, New Jersey elected United States senators by a resolution of the New Jersey Legislature.

On September 13, 1910, direct "advisory" primaries were held. Martine defeated John McDermitt of Newark for the Democratic nomination, while Stokes narrowly won a three-way Republican primary against former Governor Franklin Murphy and U.S. Representative Charles N. Fowler. Thus, Martine or Stokes stood likely to be elected Senator if their respective party won the 1910 fall legislative elections.

Republican primary

Candidates
Charles N. Fowler, U.S. Representative from Elizabeth since 1895
Franklin Murphy, chairman of the New Jersey Republican Party and former Governor (1902–1905)
Edward C. Stokes, former Governor (1905–1908) and State Senator from Cumberland County (1893–1903)

Declined
John Kean, incumbent Senator since 1899

Results

Democratic primary

Candidates
James E. Martine, candidate for mayor of Plainfield and U.S. Representative
Frank M. McDermit, Newark attorney

Results
Martine carried every county, though no Democratic vote was reported in Ocean County or Cape May.

Aftermath
Despite Martine's victory, the primary was non-binding. Former Senator James Smith Jr., who broke his alliance with Martine and Woodrow Wilson, pledged to challenge him in the January legislative election.

Results
The Senate was unable to reach a choice on January 24, so both houses met in joint session on January 25 to elect Martine.

Senate

Assembly

Joint session

References

1911
New Jersey
United States Senate